The New Hampshire Avenue–Maryland Limited Line, designated Route K9, is a limited-stop Metrobus route operated by the Washington Metropolitan Area Transit Authority between the Fort Totten station of the Red, Green, and Yellow lines of the Washington Metro and the Food and Drug Administration in White Oak, Maryland. The line operates every 16-20 minutes during weekday peak-hours only. Route K9 trips are roughly 30 - 35 minutes.

Background
Route K9 operates during the weekday peak-hours in both directions between Fort Totten station and the Food and Drug Administration. This route provides additional service for route K6 during the weekday peak-hours which operates only 14 stops Southbound and 11 stops northbound.

Route K9 currently operates out of Bladensburg division. It originally operated out of Montgomery division until 2019.

Route K9 Stops

History
Route K9 originally operated between Tamarack and Federal Triangle but was discontinued between the 1970s and 1980s.

Route K9 was reincarnated and introduced as a brand new MetroExtra route on December 30, 2012, at the request of Prince George's County, MD, Montgomery County, MD, and the City of Takoma Park, to operate as a limited stop route during weekday peak-hours, between Fort Totten station and Northwest Park Apartments, parallel to route K6 along the New Hampshire Avenue corridor. K9 was created to relieve overcrowding problems on the K6 during weekday peak-hours and provide a much faster ride between the Fort Totten and Northwest Park Apartments.

Route K9 was the first MetroExtra route introduced in Maryland since the J4 in 2002. The route would also become successful since its first day of service.

In 2013 during WMATA's FY2014 budget, WMATA proposed to extend route K9 to the White Oak Shopping Center and divert into the Food and Drug Administration building. WMATA also considered rerouting the K9 between New Hampshire Avenue & Eastern Avenue and Fort Totten station via
Eastern Avenue and Riggs Road instead of via New Hampshire Avenue and North Capitol Street instead of operating alongside the K6.

On December 29, 2013, route K9 was extended north of its original terminus at Northwest Park Apartments, to the White Oak Food and Drug Administration building. K9 also no longer divert off of New Hampshire Avenue onto the intersections of Southampton Drive and Northampton Drive, and was to instead remain straight on New Hampshire Avenue and only serve the Northwest Park Apartments at adjacent Metrobus Stops along New Hampshire Avenue. Service was replaced by the K6 and Ride On.

When the Takoma Langley Crossroads Transit Center opened on December 22, 2016, the K9 was rerouted, along with several other Metrobus, Ride On buses, Shuttle UM and TheBus routes, to serve the newly opened Transit Center. Route K9 would serve Bus Bay A alongside the K6.

During WMATA's FY2021 budget year proposal, WMATA proposed to raise the MetroExtra fare from $2.00 to $3.00 at all times. However, WMATA also proposed to add weekday midday service to route K9.

All service was suspended beginning on March 16, 2020 due to the COVID-19 pandemic. On September 26, 2020, WMATA proposed to eliminate all route K9 service due to low federal funding. Route K9 has not operated since March 17, 2020 due to Metro's response to the COVID-19 pandemic. The elimination was also brought back up in February, 2021 if WMATA does not get any federal funding. On September 5, 2021, WMATA restored the K9 back to its original schedule, but in November 2021, WMATA announced they will temporarily suspend Route K9 once again on December 26, 2021. However on May 29, 2022, Route K9 service was once again restored.

Long Term Proposals
Proposals that were mentioned towards the K9 are the following when both capital and operating funding is available:
 Extending the K9 to White Oak Transit Center to operate alongside route K6 and to revive crowding on the Z6 and Z8. This requires a capital investment in a new bus (about $750,000) as well as additional funds to pay for the operation and maintenance of the bus (about $150,000 annually).
 Add dedicated bus lanes, transit signal priority, signal re-timing, as well as new payment options, real-time bus arrival displays, and improved and fully accessible bus stops and shelters for the K9.

References

K9